The 2014 North Carolina Tar Heels men's soccer team will represent the University of North Carolina at Chapel Hill during the 2014 NCAA Division I men's soccer season.

Standings

Schedule

See also 

 North Carolina Tar Heels men's soccer
 2014 Atlantic Coast Conference men's soccer season
 2014 NCAA Division I men's soccer season
 2014 ACC Men's Soccer Tournament
 2014 NCAA Division I Men's Soccer Championship

References 

North Carolina Tar Heels
North Carolina Tar Heels men's soccer seasons
North Carolina Tar Heels
North Carolina Tar Heels